Leucomeris is a genus of Asian flowering plant in the family Asteraceae.

 Species
 Leucomeris decora Kurz - Manipur, Mizoram, Myanmar, Thailand, Vietnam
 Leucomeris spectabilis D.Don -  Uttar Pradesh, Uttarakhand, Nepal

 formerly included
see Pertya Vernonia 
 Leucomeris celebica (Blume) Blume ex DC.- Vernonia arborea Buch.-Ham.
 Leucomeris glabra Blume ex DC. - Vernonia arborea Buch.-Ham.
 Leucomeris javanica Blume ex DC. - Vernonia arborea Buch.-Ham.
 Leucomeris scandens (Thunb. ex Murray) Sch.Bip. - Pertya scandens (Thunb. ex Thunb.) Sch.Bip.

References

 
Asteraceae genera
Taxonomy articles created by Polbot